The 2017–18 Coupe de France preliminary rounds, Pays de la Loire make up the qualifying football competition to decide which teams from the French Pays de la Loire region take part in the main competition from the seventh round.

First round 
The matches in Pays de la Loire were played on 26 and 27 August 2017.

First round results: Pays de la Loire

Second round 
These matches were played on 2 and 3 September 2017.

Second round results: Pays de la Loire

Third round 
These matches were played on 9 and 10 September 2017.

Third round results: Pays de la Loire

Fourth round 
These matches were played on 23 and 24 September 2017.

Fourth round results: Pays de la Loire

Fifth round 
These matches were played on 7 and 8 October 2017.

Fifth round results: Pays de la Loire

Sixth round 
These matches were played on 21 and 22 October 2017.

Sixth round results: Pays de la Loire

References 

2017–18 Coupe de France